Baljek Airport  (also known as Tura Airport) is a public airport located at Baljek,  North-east of Tura in Meghalaya, India.

The proposal for the airport was sent to the Central Government in 1983 and the project was sanctioned in 1995. The airport was inaugurated in October 2008. It was built at a cost of Rs 12.52 crore and was initially designed to handle 20 seater aircraft like the Dornier 228.

The Airports Authority of India (AAI) is developing the airport for operation of ATR 42/ATR 72 type of aircraft. The 3,300 foot runway will be extended by another 1,200 feet. A total of 58 acres of additional land was acquired at a cost of Rs 2.58 crore to aid the expansion of the airport.

No scheduled commercial air service are available at the Baljek Airport at this time. The nearest airport is Guwahati Airport which is approx. 180 KM from Tura and it is said to be operating by the end of 2022.

References

Airports in Meghalaya
Tura, Meghalaya
2008 establishments in Meghalaya
Airports established in 2008